Christopher Nakai Nettey (born 17 July 1998) is a Ghanaian footballer who plays as a right-back for Great Olympics and the Ghana national football team.

Club career

Early career 
Nettey began his career at Division One League side Attram De Visser Soccer Academy, before joining Accra Great Olympics on loan along with 9 players from the club including Godfred Odametey in the 2017 season. On 18 February 2017, Nettey made his debut for Olympics in an away league match Ashanti Gold in the process playing the full 90 minutes as Olympics lost by 3–1 away.

Asante Kotoko 
In December 2019, Asante Kotoko announced that they had signed him from Accra-based club Attram de Visser Soccer Academy on a three-year contract. On 22 December 2019, he won his first trophy with the club, after Asante Kotoko defeated their rivals Hearts of Oak by 2–1 victory in the President's Cup.

On 29 December, during the first match of the season, he was handed his debut and a starting-berth in Kotoko's 1–0 victory over Techiman Eleven Wonders. In the 2019–20 Ghana Premier League season, Nettey played in all 13 matches in his debut season for the club and won three NASCO man of the match awards before the league came to an abrupt end and was cancelled due to the COVID-19 pandemic.

Great Olympics 
After much speculation over the previous few month, on 25 January 2023 Nettey signed a contract to return to his previous club, Great Olympics after his contract with Asante Kotoko had expired.

International career 
In November 2020, after Harrison Afful withdrew due to injuries, Nettey received his first call-up to the Ghana national team for a double-header 2021 AFCON qualifiers against Sudan. On 12 November, he made his debut against Sudan in the 2021 AFCON qualifiers Group C match at the Cape Coast Sports Stadium, starting in the right-back position as Ghana won 2–0.

Honours 
Asante Kotoko

 Ghana Premier League: 2021–22
 President's Cup: 2019

References

External links 

 
 

Living people
1998 births
Asante Kotoko S.C. players
Ghana Premier League players
Accra Great Olympics F.C. players
Ghana international footballers
Ghanaian footballers
Attram De Visser Soccer Academy players
Association football defenders